Les McAteer (born 19 August 1945 in Birkenhead) is an English amateur and professional light middle/middle/light heavyweight boxer of the 1960s and '70s who as an amateur won the Amateur Boxing Association of England (ABAE) 1960 Schools Intermediate title, boxing out of Birkenhead, and won the Amateur Boxing Association of England (ABAE) 1962 Junior Class-B title against K. Kemp (West Ham Boys' Club), boxing out of Willaston Birkenhead ABC, and as a professional won the British Boxing Board of Control (BBBofC) Central Area middleweight title, BBBofC British middleweight title, and Commonwealth middleweight title, ( between 14th   July 1969 - 12th May 1970) and  was a challenger for the BBBofC British middleweight title, and British Commonwealth middleweight title against Johnny Pritchett, and European Boxing Union (EBU) middleweight title against Tom Bogs, his professional fighting weight varied from , i.e. light middleweight to , i.e. light heavyweight. Les McAteer was managed by Johnny Campbell (circa-1905 — 2 May 1994 (aged 89)).

Genealogical information
Les McAteer is the younger brother of Brian McAteer (birth registered January→March  in Birkenhead district), Niel McAteer (birth registered January→March  in Birkenhead district), and the boxer Gordon McAteer (birth registered April→June  in Birkenhead district), the older brother of William McAteer (birth registered July→September  in Birkenhead district), and Patricia McAteer (birth registered October→December  in Birkenhead district), the cousin of the boxer Pat McAteer, and relative of association (soccer) footballer Jason McAteer.

References

External links

Image - Les McAteer
Merseyside Form Boxers Association → The Greats → Les McAteer

1945 births
Living people
English male boxers
Light-heavyweight boxers
Light-middleweight boxers
Middleweight boxers
Sportspeople from Birkenhead
Boxers from Liverpool